Heinz Lowin (25 December 1938 – 12 October 1987) was a German football defender.

Career

Statistics

References

External links
 

1938 births
1987 deaths
German footballers
Germany under-21 international footballers
Bundesliga players
VfL Bochum players
Borussia Mönchengladbach players
VVV-Venlo players
Association football defenders